The 1928 Cornell Big Red football team was an American football team that represented Cornell University during the 1928 college football season.  In their eighth season under head coach Gil Dobie, the Big Red compiled a 3–3–2 record and were outscored by their opponents by a combined total of 86 to 72.

Schedule

References

Cornell
Cornell Big Red football seasons
Cornell Big Red football